Neung-in High School is a high school in Daegu, South Korea. As of July 2011, the school had 1492 students enrolled.

The school was established on 13 January 1938 and opened on 8 April 1940.

Notable alumni
Joo Ho-young, a Korean government minister.

References

External links
 Official Website

High schools in Daegu
Buddhist schools in South Korea
Educational institutions established in 1938
Boys' schools in South Korea
1938 establishments in Korea